Tanjung Aru is a sub-district of Kota Kinabalu in Sabah, of Malaysia. Its main feature is its beach called Tanjung Aru Beach which stretches to over 2 kilometres long along with new skyscrapers. This beach has a lot of Casuarina equisetifolia trees (aru) there naming this town.

It also has its own township called Tanjung Aru Town. Other notable features include the Perdana Park, the Kinabalu Golf Club, the Kinabalu Yacht Club, and the Tanjung Aru railway station of Sabah State Railway.

Education
 La Salle Secondary School, Kota Kinabalu
 Stella Maris Secondary School
 Stella Maris Primary School
 Tanjung Aru Primary School

Libraries
 Tanjung Aru Library

Place of Worship

Mosque (Muslim)
 Masjid Al Kauthar

Church (Christian)
 Calvary Charismatic Centre 
 Stella Maris Catholic Church
 True Jesus Church

Hotels
 Shangri-La's Tanjung Aru Resort & Spa
 C'Haya Hotel 
 Casuarina Hotel
 Aru Suites

In popular culture
The neighbourhood of Tanjung Aru Village served as the 3rd Pit Stop in the 24th season of American edition of The Amazing Race and the 2nd Pit Stop in 4th season of the Asian version.

Gallery

Politics 
 
 Parliament - Putatan 
 State Level - Tanjung Aru
 Local Government - Kota Kinabalu City Hall

See also 
 Tanjung Aru Eco Development

References 

Kota Kinabalu